Matt Clark (born November 25, 1936) is an American actor, director, and screenwriter. He is best known for his roles in Western films.

Early life
Clark was born in Washington, D.C., the son of Theresa (née Castello), a teacher, and Frederick William Clark, a carpenter. After serving in the United States Army, he attended George Washington University, but later dropped out.

Career 
After working at various jobs, he joined a local D.C. theatre group. He later became a member of New York's Living Theatre company and worked off-Broadway and in community theatre in the late 1950s.

Clark directed the 1988 film Da, as well as one episode from the television series CBS Schoolbreak Special and two episodes from the television series Midnight Caller. He also wrote the story for the 1970 film Homer.

Filmography

Film

Television

References

External links

1936 births
American male film actors
American male television actors
American television directors
Living people
Male actors from Georgia (U.S. state)
Male actors from Washington, D.C.
George Washington University alumni